Woo Hyo-eun, better known as Oohyo, is a South Korean synth-pop singer. She has released two extended plays, Girl Sense (2014),, and Silence (2020); and two full-length albums, Adventure (2015), Far From the Madding City (2019).

Career 
Oohyo spent her childhood abroad and debuted in May 2014 with her first EP, Girl Sense. The EP included songs she wrote during her high school years, and 5 out of 8 songs are in English. She has attracted international attention as a rising synth pop musician. Returning to Korea after college, she released her first full-length album, Adventure, in October 2015. Again a mix of songs performed in Korean and English, the album was nominated for three awards in the 13th Korean Music Awards in 2016. She released her second studio album, Far from the Madding City, in April 2019. This album contains collaborations with other artists such as starRo.

Discography

Studio albums

Extended plays

Singles 
 Friday (February 16, 2015)
 Youth (July 5, 2016)
 PIZZA (March 15, 2017)
 Dandelion (May 30, 2017)
 Honey Tea (January 2, 2018)
 Papercut (July 4, 2018)
 Butter Chicken (December 11, 2019)
 Brave (April 29, 2020)
 Everlasting God (September 27, 2021)

Soundtrack appearances

Featuring singles 

Awards and nominations

References 

1993 births
South Korean women pop singers
Living people